The 2015 Chicago Sky season was the franchise's 10th season in the Women's National Basketball Association (WNBA).

Transactions

WNBA Draft

Trades and Roster Changes

Roster
{| class="toccolours" style="font-size: 95%; width: 100%;"
|-
! colspan="2"  style="background:#4b90cc; color:#Fbb726"|2015 Chicago Sky Roster
|- style="text-align:center; background-color:#Fbb726; color:#FFFFFF;"
! Players !! Coaches
|-
| valign="top" |
{| class="sortable" style="background:transparent; margin:0px; width:100%;"
! Pos. !! # !! Nat. !! Name !! Ht. !! Wt. !! From
|-

Depth

Schedule

Preseason

|- bgcolor="bbffbb"
| 1 || May 22 || New York || W 55–83 || Elena Delle Donne (16) || Delle Donnedos Santos (8) || Allie Quigley (4) || Bob Carpenter Center3,105 || 1–0
|- style="background:#fcc;"
| 2 || May 27 || Los Angeles || L 76–67 || Courtney Vandersloot (15) || Tamera Young (6) || Cappie Pondexter (6) || Mohegan Sun Arena3,947 || 1–1
|- bgcolor="bbffbb"
| 3 || May 28  || China || W 59–92 || Elena Delle Donne (18) || Cheyenne Parker (6) || VanderslootGemelos (3) || Mohegan Sun Arena || 2–1
|-

Regular Season

|- bgcolor="bbffbb"
| 1 || June 5 || New York || W 72–95 || Elena Delle Donne (31) || Jessica Breland (13) || Allie Quigley (5) || Allstate Arena8,123 || 1–0
|- style="background:#fcc;"
| 2 || June 6 || @ Tulsa || L 101–93 || Elena Delle Donne (40) || Delle Donne (9) || Courtney Vandersloot (6) || BOK Center7,256 || 1–1
|- style="background:#fcc;"
| 3 || June 11 || @ Connecticut || L 65–67 || Elena Delle Donne (27) || PondexterLaney (8) || Courtney Vandersloot (4) || Mohegan Sun Arena4,523 || 1–2
|- bgcolor="bbffbb"
| 4 || June 14|| @ Indiana || W 98–72 || Elena Delle Donne (24) || Elena Delle Donne (9) || VanderslootPondexter (4) || Bankers Life Fieldhouse6,433 || 2–2
|- style="background:#fcc;"
| 5 || June 19 || @ Atlanta || L 74–73 || Elena Delle Donne (26) || Delle Donnedos Santos (10) || Elena Delle Donne (3) || Philips Arena5,166 || 2–3
|- bgcolor="bbffbb"
| 6 || June 20 || @ San Antonio || W 95–87 OT || Elena Delle Donne (28) || Elena Delle Donne (13) || Courtney Vandersloot (8) || Freeman Coliseum4,026 || 3–3
|- bgcolor="bbffbb"
| 7 || June 24 || Atlanta || W 96–100 OT || Elena Delle Donne (45) || Elena Delle Donne (11) || Courtney Vandersloot (5) || Allstate Arena9,893 || 4–3
|- bgcolor="bbffbb"
| 8 || June 26|| @ Indiana || W 83–77 || Cappie Pondexter (23) || Elena Delle Donne (14) || Courtney Vandersloot (7) || Bankers Life Fieldhouse6,889 || 5–3
|- style="background:#fcc;"
| 9 || June 28 || @ Washington || L 86–71 || Elena Delle Donne (26) || Elena Delle Donne (7) || Courtney Vandersloot (4) || Verizon Center7,400 || 5–4
|- style="background:#fcc;"
| 10 || June 30 || New York || L 89–81 || Elena Delle Donne (26) || Elena Delle Donne (13) || Courtney Vandersloot (10) || Allstate Arena5,048 || 5–5
|-

|- bgcolor="bbffbb"
| 11 || July 2 || @ Connecticut || W 77–74 || Allie Quigley (19) || Elena Delle Donne (10) || Cappie Pondexter (4) || Mohegan Sun Arena5,607 || 6–5
|- bgcolor="bbffbb"
| 12 || July 10 || 2015 Minnesota Lynx season || W 83–90 || Delle DonnePondexter (24) || BrelandDelle Donne (10) || Faulkner (6) || Allstate Arena6,709 || 7–5
|- bgcolor="bbffbb"
| 13 || July 12 || Connecticut || W 76–96 || Cappie Pondexter (29) || Elena Delle Donne (8) || Cappie Pondexter (7) || Allstate Arena5,051 || 8–5
|- bgcolor="bbffbb"
| 14 || July 15 || Washington || W 57–85 || Allie Quigley (15) || Elena Delle Donne (10) || Jamierra Faulkner (5) || Allstate Arena16,304 || 9–5
|- style="background:#fcc;"
| 15 || July 17|| @ Minnesota || L 66–84 || Jessica Breland (17) || Clarissa dos Santos (13) || Courtney Vandersloot (5) || Target Center9,033 || 9–6
|- bgcolor="bbffbb"
| 16 || July 19 || San Antonio Stars || W 93–82 || Elena Delle Donne (29) || Elena Delle Donne (13) || Courtney Vandersloot (8) || Allstate Arena5,011 || 10–6
|- bgcolor="bbffbb"
| 17 || July 21 || Atlanta || W 97–92 || Elena Delle Donne (27) || Elena Delle Donne (8) || Courtney Vandersloot (4) || Allstate Arena5,967 || 11–6
|- style="background:#fcc;"
| 18 || July 28 || @ Phoenix || L 87–89 OT || Elena Delle Donne (32) || Clarissa dos Santos (8) || Courtney Vandersloot (6) || US Airways Center10,707|| 11–7
|- style="background:#fcc;"
| 19 || July 31 || Los Angeles || L 88–77 || Delle Donne (21) || Breland (7) || Vandersloot (13) || Allstate Arena7,014 || 11–8
|-

|- bgcolor="bbffbb"
| 20 || August 2 || Washington || W 69–68 || Elena Delle Donne (22) || de Souza (10) || Courtney Vandersloot (10) || Allstate Arena4,141 || 12–8
|- bgcolor="bbffbb"
| 21 || August 4 || Indiana || W 106–82 || Elena Delle Donne (19) || Delle DonnePondexterYoung (6) || Courtney Vandersloot (7) || Allstate Arena4,979 || 13–8
|- style="background:#fcc;"
| 22 || August 7 || New York || L 77–63 || Elena Delle Donne (17) || Elena Delle Donne (6) || VanderslootQuigley (2) || Allstate Arena5,992 || 13–9
|- bgcolor="bbffbb"
| 23 || August 9 || Phoenix || W 74–64 || Elena Delle Donne (33) || Jessica Breland (13) || Courtney Vandersloot (7) || Allstate Arena7,181 || 14–9
|- style="background:#fcc;"
| 24 || August 11 || @ New York || L 63–84 || Cappie Pondexter (23) || Jessica Breland (7) || Courtney Vandersloot (9) || Madison Square Garden9,987 || 14–10
|- bgcolor="bbffbb"
| 25 || August 14 || @ Seattle || W 94–84 || Delle DonneVandersloot (21) || Jessica Breland (11) || Courtney Vandersloot (8) || Key Arena5,684 || 15–10
|- style="background:#fcc;"
| 26 || August 16 || @ Los Angeles || L 76–64 || Elena Delle Donne (23) || Delle Donnede Souza (8) || Courtney Vandersloot (4) || Staples Center7,110 || 15–11
|- bgcolor="bbffbb"
| 27 || August 21 || Washington || W 87–85 || Elena Delle Donne (22) || Delle DonneVanderslootdos Santos (8) || Courtney Vandersloot (10) || Allstate Arena5,861 || 16–11
|- bgcolor="bbffbb"
| 28 || August 23 || @ Washington || W 66–64 || Elena Delle Donne (18) || Elena Delle Donne (10) || BrelandVandersloot (2) || Verizon Center7,400 || 17–11
|- bgcolor="bbffbb"
| 29 || August 29 || @ Atlanta || W 98–96 || Cappie Pondexter (22) || Erika de Souza (7) || Courtney Vandersloot (7) || Philips Arena6,872 || 18–11
|- style="background:#fcc;"
| 30 || August 30 || Connecticut || L 72–68 || Cappie Pondexter (18) || Jessica Breland (7) || Courtney Vandersloot (5) || Allstate Arena5,969 || 18–12
|-

|- bgcolor="bbffbb"
| 31 || September 3 || @ New York || W 82–60 || Courtney Vandersloot (21) || Brelandde Souza (8) || Courtney Vandersloot (5) || Madison Square Garden8,496 || 19–12
|- bgcolor="bbffbb"
| 32 || September 6 || Seattle || W 65–93 || Allie Quigley (17) || Erika de Souza (8) || VanderslootFaulkner (6) || Allstate Arena6,205 || 20–12
|- bgcolor="bbffbb"
| 33 || September 11 || Tulsa || W 71–92 || Elena Delle Donne (21) || YoungParker (5) || Courtney Vandersloot (9) || Allstate Arena7,753 || 21–12
|- style="background:#fcc;"
| 34 || September 13|| @ Connecticut || L 75–86 || Elena Delle Donne (28) || Erika de Souza (9) || Tamera Young (4) || Mohegan Sun Arena8,049 || 21–13
|-

Playoffs

|- bgcolor="bbffbb"
| 1
| September 17
| Indiana
| W 77–72
| Courtney Vandersloot (17)
| Elena Delle Donne (11)
| QuigleyVandersloot (5)
| UIC Pavilion4,098
| 1–0
|- style="background:#fcc;"
| 2
| September 19
| @ Indiana
| L 82–89
| Courtney Vandersloot (19)
| Erika de Souza (8)
| Courtney Vandersloot (6)
| Bankers Life Fieldhouse7,124
| 1–1
|- style="background:#fcc;"
| 2
| September 21
| Indiana
| L 100–89
| Elena Delle Donne (40)
| Jessica Breland (8)
| Courtney Vandersloot (14)
| Allstate Arena2,882
| 1–2
|-

Standings

Playoffs

Statistics

Regular Season

Playoffs

Awards and Honors

References

External links
THE OFFICIAL SITE OF THE CHICAGO SKY

Chicago Sky seasons
Chicago
2015 in sports in Illinois